Emmanuel Ndong (born 4 May 1992) is a Gabonese professional footballer who plays as a midfielder for CF Mounana and the Gabon national team. He competed at the 2012 Summer Olympics.

References

External links
 

1992 births
Living people
Gabonese footballers
Association football midfielders
Olympic footballers of Gabon
Footballers at the 2012 Summer Olympics
US Bitam players
CF Mounana players
21st-century Gabonese people